Hossam Hassan Hussein (born 10 August 1966) is an Egyptian professional football coach and former player who played as a striker. A prolific goalscorer, he is Egypt's all-time top scorer with 83 goals in 176 appearances. His twin brother Ibrahim also played professional football, and they shared teams for most of their extensive careers.

Hassan represented the national team in the 1990 World Cup and seven Africa Cup of Nations tournaments. He is regarded as one of the best players in African football history and is the third most capped player in men's international football.

Club career
Other than two spells abroad in Switzerland and Greece, Cairo-born Hassan played mainly for hometown's Al Ahly, for which he made his first-team debuts aged 18, playing his last match for the club sixteen years later. He ranked first in the club in several categories and won a total of 25 titles with it, including 11 leagues; he was only one of two players ever to find the net in derbies for each team.

During his spell at Neuchâtel Xamax in Switzerland he is most remembered for scoring four goals in one game against Celtic in the 1991–92 UEFA Cup

In 2000, already at 34, Hassan left Al-Ahly, going to represent Al Ain SCC, Zamalek SC – adding three more leagues and the 2002 CAF Champions League – Al-Masry Club, Tersana and Al-Ittihad Al-Sakndary, while continuing to score at length. He retired aged almost 42, having played most of the time with his sibling Ibrahim, including abroad.

International career
He appeared for the nation at the 1990 FIFA World Cup, helping the Pharaohs achieve two draws while narrowly going down 0–1 to England. Ibrahim was also an undisputed starter.

Aged 40, Hassan was captain of the national team at the 2006 African Cup of Nations, and played three times and netted once for the hosts, winning the last of his three continental competitions.

Coaching career
On 29 February 2008, Hassan was named both general manager and coach of former club Al-Masry, before signing at modest Itesalat.

After the sacking of French coach Henri Michel, he was named manager of former side Zamalek, on 30 November 2009. his first match in charge was on 3 December, which ended in a controversial 1–2 away loss against Haras El Hodood, as opposing player Ahmed Eid Abdel Malek was not supposed to play in that match, having been sent off the previous one (Abdel Malek ended up playing, and scored Hodood's first goal).

Hassan's first win at Zamalek came on the 12th, against Al-Masry (3–0). In twelve matches he took the club from 14th place to second, only losing one game and drawing another, before being sacked.

He later had short spells with Ismaily, Al Masry and Misr Lel Makkasa. He then became the head coach of Jordan, where he led the team during the 2014 FIFA World Cup qualification, including the AFC Fifth Round against Uzbekistan, then at the AFC–CONMEBOL play-off against Uruguay.

Later on, he returned to Egypt to coach Zamalek, Al Ittihad Alexandria, then Al Masry from 2015 to 2018, where he reached the 2017 Egypt Cup Final, and semi-final of the 2018 CAF Confederation Cup. Afterwards, he managed Pyramids and Smouha, before returning to coach Al Ittihad Alexandria in October 2020.
then he returned to Al Masry

Personal life
Hassan is openly supported longtime president Hosni Mubarak during the 2011 Egyptian revolution, which eventually led to the politician's resignation.

He, along with his brother Ibrahim, led marches in support of Mubarak. He is the father of four children.

Career statistics

Club

1Played in CAF Champions League, CAF Winners' Cup, CAF Super Cup and UEFA Cup/UEFA Europa League.
2Includes other competitive competitions, including the Egyptian Super Cup, Arab Champions League, Arab Cup Winners' Cup, Arab Super Cup, Saudi-Egyptian Super Cup and Afro-Asian Cup.

International

Managerial statistics

Honours

Club
Al Ahly
Egyptian Premier League (11): 1984–85, 1985–86, 1986–87, 1988–89, 1993–94, 1994–95, 1995–96, 1996–97, 1997–98, 1998–99, 1999–2000
Egypt Cup: 1984–85, 1988–89, 1992–93, 1995–96
African Cup Winners' Cup: 1984, 1985, 1986, 1993
African Cup of Champions Clubs: 1987
Arab Club Champions Cup: 1996
Arab Cup Winners' Cup: 1994–95
Arab Super Cup: 1997, 1998
Afro-Asian Cup: 1988

Al Ain
UAE Pro League: 1999–2000

Zamalek
Egyptian Premier League (3): 2000–01, 2002–03, 2003–04
Egypt Cup: 2001–02
Egyptian Super Cup: 2001, 2002
CAF Champions League: 2002
CAF Super Cup: 2003
UAFA Club Cup: 2003
Saudi-Egyptian Super Cup: 2003

International
Egypt
African Cup of Nations: 1986, 1998, 2006
Arab Nations Cup: 1992
All-Africa Games: 1987

Individual
African Cup of Nations Top Scorer: 1998 (shared with Benni McCarthy)
Confederation of African Football: Best African Footballer in the last 50 years
Egyptian Premier League Top Scorer: 1998–99, 2001–02

See also

 List of men's footballers with 100 or more international caps
 List of men's footballers with 50 or more international goals

Notes

References

External links

Hussam Hassan Egyptian legend 

All about Egyptian players
Hossam Hassan, World's most capped player; at AngelFire
Hossam Hassan at RSSSF

1966 births
Living people
Egyptian twins
Footballers from Cairo
Twin sportspeople
Egyptian footballers
Association football forwards
Al Ahly SC players
Zamalek SC players
Al Masry SC players
Al Ittihad Alexandria Club players
Tersana SC players
Super League Greece players
PAOK FC players
Swiss Super League players
Neuchâtel Xamax FCS players
Al Ain FC players
Egypt international footballers
UAE Pro League players
1990 FIFA World Cup players
1999 FIFA Confederations Cup players
1986 African Cup of Nations players
1988 African Cup of Nations players
1992 African Cup of Nations players
1998 African Cup of Nations players
2000 African Cup of Nations players
2002 African Cup of Nations players
2006 Africa Cup of Nations players
Africa Cup of Nations-winning players
Egyptian expatriate footballers
Expatriate footballers in Greece
Expatriate footballers in Switzerland
Expatriate footballers in the United Arab Emirates
Egyptian expatriate sportspeople in Switzerland
FIFA Century Club
Egyptian football managers
Al Masry SC managers
Zamalek SC managers
Ismaily SC managers
Jordan national football team managers
Al Ittihad Alexandria Club managers
Pyramids FC managers
Egyptian Premier League players
Egyptian expatriate sportspeople in Greece
Egyptian expatriate sportspeople in Jordan
Egyptian expatriate football managers
Smouha SC managers
Egyptian expatriate sportspeople in the United Arab Emirates
Expatriate football managers in Jordan
Egyptian Premier League managers